Volgar FC is an association football club based in Astrakhan, Russia. They play in the Russian First League.

History
The club has been known under following names:
Pishchevik (food industry worker) (1925−1958)
Trud (labour) (1958–59)
Volgar (1960–94) (2012–)
Volgar-Gazprom (1995–2007), (2010–2012)
Volgar-Gazprom-2 (2007–10)

Pishchevik played in the Second Group of the Soviet League. Trud (and later Volgar) played in the Class B (1958, 1960–1967), in Class A, Group 2 (1968–1969), in Class A, Group 1 (1970), Soviet First League (1971), Soviet Second League (1972–1990), Soviet Second League B (1991). In 1992 Volgar entered the Russian Second League, played in the Third League in 1994 (finished top and were promoted), returned to the Second League in 1995 and stayed until 1998. In 1998 Volgar-Gazprom were promoted and in 1999 they started playing in the Russian First Division. With the exception of the relegation for the 2004 season, Volgar-Gazprom had been in the First Division until 2006. The club was denied the professional licence and thus relegated to amateur level in 2007. Another club was organized called FC Volgar-Gazprom-2. The new club advanced to the Russian First Division for the 2009 season.

After the 2017–18 season, the club experienced financial difficulties and decided to be voluntarily relegated to the third-tier PFL.

On 15 May 2020, the 2019–20 PFL season was abandoned due to COVID-19 pandemic in Russia. As Volgar was leading in their PFL zone at the time, they were promoted to the second-tier FNL for the 2020–21 season.

Current squad
As of 21 February 2023, according to the Russian First League website.

Out on loan

Notable past players
Had international caps for their respective countries. Players whose name is listed in bold represented their countries while playing for Volgar.

Russia/USSR
 Rinat Dasayev
  Dmitry Kuznetsov
 Vasili Zhupikov
 Viktor Bulatov
 Ruslan Kambolov
 Vladimir Lebed
 Ramiz Mamedov
 Gennadiy Nizhegorodov
 Aleksei Sutormin
 Sergei Terekhov
 Vladislav Ternavsky
 Anton Zabolotny
Former USSR countries
 Garnik Avalyan
 Stanislav Buchnev

 Manuk Kakosyan
 Tigran Petrosyan
 Gurban Gurbanov
 Barys Haravoy
 Vasily Khomutovsky
 Vitaliy Abramov
 Konstantin Ledovskikh
 Almir Mukhutdinov
 Roman Uzdenov
 Aleksandrs Isakovs
 Valērijs Ivanovs
 Ivans Lukjanovs
 Igors Sļesarčuks
 Artūras Fomenka
 Tadas Gražiūnas
 Nerijus Radžius

 Ilie Cebanu
 Alexandr Covalenco
 Stanislav Namașco
 Farkhod Vosiyev
 Oleksandr Svystunov
 Sergey Andreyev
 Gennadiy Sharipov

Danila Yashchuck

Europe
 Dželaludin Muharemović
 Luboš Kalouda
 Marek Hollý
 Andrej Pečnik

References

External links
Official website 

 
Football clubs in Russia
Sport in Astrakhan
1960 establishments in Russia
Association football clubs established in 1960